Sewa or SEWA may refer to:

 Sêwa, a feminine name in Kurdish language taken from Sêw which means apple.
 Sêwa or Sewu, Tibet, a village in Tibet
 Self-Employed Women's Association of India, a trade union in India
 Sewa, volunteer work offered to God (in Indian religions)
 Sewa (film), a 1942 Bollywood film
 Sewa (moth), a moth genus
 Sewa River, a river in Sierra Leone
 SEWA (Sharjah Electricity and Water Authority)

People with the surname 
 Manga Sewa (died 1884), Yalunka chief from Sierra Leone
 Ssewa Ssewa (born 1987), Ugandan musician

See also 
 Seva (disambiguation)